Claire Lacombe (4 August 1765-2 May 1826) was a French actress and revolutionary. She is best known for her contributions during the French Revolution. Though it was only for a few years, Lacombe was a revolutionary and a founding member of the Society of Revolutionary Republican Women.

Early life
Lacombe was born in the provincial town of Pamiers in southwestern France. She became an actress at a young age and appeared in theatrical productions in the provinces before arriving in Paris in 1792. She was not an outstanding success in the theater, and she was not entirely happy with her life. The acting company that Lacombe worked for moved from town to town and sometimes went to castles and the country houses of aristocrats. This probably had an influence in her decision to quit the company to become a revolutionary.

Revolutionary career

In Paris during the insurrection of 10 August 1792, Lacombe fought with the rebels during the storming of the Tuileries. She was shot through the arm but kept fighting on, earning herself the lifelong sobriquet, "Heroine of August Tenth". For her bravery, she was awarded a civic crown by the victorious fédérés.

Lacombe became a frequent attendee at meetings of the Cordeliers Club through which she became involved with the most radical elements of the Revolution. In February, 1793, Lacombe and another female revolutionary, Pauline Léon, founded the Society of Revolutionary Republican Women. Composed chiefly of working-class women, the Society associated with the most militant revolutionaries, sans-culottes and enragés. They functioned partly as a fighting force among the market women of Paris, and employed violent tactics to root out anti-revolutionaries.

Despite the deeply entrenched chauvinism of the time, there were a few men among the revolutionaries who supported the fight for women's rights. One of these was Théophile Leclerc, with whom she lived for a while, until he left her to marry Pauline Léon.

Under the Reign of Terror, the enragés were suppressed, along with most other extremist groups, including the Society of Revolutionary Republican Women.

Lacombe tried to defend herself, but it was too late; although she was only briefly detained, the seed of distrust had been planted in the minds of the revolution’s leaders. The Society tried in vain to continue to petition the Convention. Most of the issues that they now dealt with were more trivial and less radical than their previous campaigns; ostensibly, the notoriety resulting from the anti-reactionary violence of the Society led the National Convention to specifically ban women's political organizations on 30 October 1793.  However, Chaumette's subsequent comments about men's right to have women care for the family, and how domestic duties were the only civic duties women had, suggests the group’s suppression was less a reaction to its violent actions in service of the Revolution, and more due to men’s fear of losing their control over the productive — and reproductive — labors of the female sex.

Barred from any political activity, Lacombe attempted a return to her acting career. In April of 1794, she was arrested as she prepared to leave for a theater in Dunkirk.  Lacombe was released from prison on 20 August 1795, by order of the Committee of General Security. She again returned to the theater, but quit again after three months.

Suffering from mental health problems, she was admitted to the Pitié-Salpêtrière Hospital on 19 June 1821, where her profession was recorded as "teacher" ("institutrice"). She died there on 2 May 1826, from a cardiac aneurysm. This combination of ailments may suggest that she was suffering from Syphilitic aortitis.

References 

Bibliography

Further reading

1765 births
People from Pamiers
18th-century French actresses
French stage actresses
People of the French Revolution
Year of death missing
Female revolutionaries
Women in the French Revolution
18th-century women politicians
18th-century French politicians
Enragés